Kamomé–Dilecta was a French professional cycling team that existed in 1966 and 1967. It participated in the 1966 Tour de France, with Pierre Beuffeuil winning stage 21.

References

Cycling teams based in France
Defunct cycling teams based in France
1966 establishments in France
1967 disestablishments in France
Cycling teams established in 1966
Cycling teams disestablished in 1967